Eileen Davies  (born 23 September 1948) is an English actress, nominated for best supporting actress at the British Independent Film Awards 2012 for her performance in the film Sightseers, her roles have included “Flora McArdle” in the TV serial Coronation Street and as Joan Murfield  in EastEnders and Molly in Allelujah (2022).

Acting career
Eileen Davies was born and lives in Hastings, East Sussex. 
Eileen is one of a small group actors that have made appearances on both EastEnders and Coronation Street, the British TV serials. Davies has played 3 characters in the ITV TV serial Coronation Street, the role of Judge Anne Carmichael back in 2006, then as Celia Smethurst for 2 episodes in 2015, and more recently as  Flora McArdle for a further 19 episodes in 2018. Davies also played the role of Joan Murfield  in EastEnders for five episodes between 2017 and 2018.
Elieen Davies was nominated for best supporting actress award at the British Independent Film Awards 2012 for her performance in the film Sightseers. However the award went to Olivia Colman.

In 2022, Davies starred in Allelujah, a film adaptation of Alan Bennett's play of the same name with a cast which included Jennifer Saunders, Russell Tovey, David Bradley, Derek Jacobi, and Judi Dench.

Filmography

TV

Awards and nominations

References

External links
IMDb biography for Eileen Davies
James Foster Ltd Agent for - Eileen Davies

1948 births
20th-century English actresses
21st-century English actresses
English film actresses
English soap opera actresses
English television actresses
Living people